The Biese is a river in the German state of Saxony-Anhalt, source river of the Aland. It is the continuation of the river Milde, downstream from Beese. The Biese flows into the Aland in Seehausen.

See also
List of rivers of Saxony-Anhalt

References

Rivers of Saxony-Anhalt
Rivers of Germany